Kailasapuram is a residential area of the city of Visakhapatnam state of Andhra Pradesh, India.

About
in early 1990s Visakhapatnam Port employees settled hear from that period to till now this area is one of the best residential area in the city.

Transport
APSRTC buses are 48,48A available from old city.

APSRTC routes

References

Neighbourhoods in Visakhapatnam